The Southern Oregon Raiders football program is a college football team that represents Southern Oregon University in the Frontier Conference, a part of the National Association of Intercollegiate Athletics (NAIA). The team has had 16 head coaches since its first recorded football game in 1927. The current coach is Charlie Hall who first took the position for the 2017 season.

Key

Coaches

Notes

References

Lists of college football head coaches

Oregon sports-related lists